The master plan of Baku White City refers to the re-development of a portion of Black City, 221-hectare land area, conceptualized to be part of the 2021 strategic plan for Baku.

Development 
The project has been designed by Atkins and Foster and Partners. Around 75 per cent of the project will be residential units, creating a new community of 19,700 households for about 50,000 people as well as commercial and leisure units that will provide up to 48,000 jobs. The project was completed in 2022.

In 2014, the Lycée français de Bakou (Baku French Lyceum) located in White City was inaugurated by President Ilham Aliyev. In 2015, the eastern part of the Baku Boulevard, the city's seaside promenade, was extended by two kilometers to cover the coastal part of White City, which also became the site of the newly built Boulevard Hotel Baku.

Opening ceremony 
The opening ceremony of Baku White City took place on 24 December 2011. President Aliyev and his wife Mehriban Aliyeva attended an opening ceremony of Baku White City project.
n 26 December 2016. The vice president and the head of state observed the first settlements on Green Island. They also laid the foundation stone for Fountains Square park, a pedestrian passage and a public parking complex.

Baku White City Office Building 
In 2015, the Baku White City Office Building became the first property in Azerbaijan to be awarded BREEAM certification on international ecological standards with the rating of Good.

Gallery

External links 
Official website
Map of BWC

References

Buildings and structures under construction in Baku
Buildings and structures in Baku
Populated places in Baku
Urban planning in Azerbaijan
Tourist attractions in Baku
Baku